The 1935 Cleveland Indians season was a season in American baseball. The team finished in 3rd place, 12 games behind league champion Detroit.

Regular season

Season standings

Record vs. opponents

Notable transactions 
 August 12, 1935: Shanty Hogan was signed as a free agent by the Indians.

Roster

Player stats

Batting

Starters by position 
Note: Pos = Position; G = Games played; AB = At bats; H = Hits; Avg. = Batting average; HR = Home runs; RBI = Runs batted in

Other batters 
Note: G = Games played; AB = At bats; H = Hits; Avg. = Batting average; HR = Home runs; RBI = Runs batted in

Pitching

Starting pitchers 
Note: G = Games pitched; IP = Innings pitched; W = Wins; L = Losses; ERA = Earned run average; SO = Strikeouts

Other pitchers 
Note: G = Games pitched; IP = Innings pitched; W = Wins; L = Losses; ERA = Earned run average; SO = Strikeouts

Relief pitchers 
Note: G = Games pitched; W = Wins; L = Losses; SV = Saves; ERA = Earned run average; SO = Strikeouts

Awards and honors 
All Star Game

Earl Averill, Outfielder (replaced due to injury)

Mel Harder, Pitcher

Joe Vosmik, Outfielder (Starter)

Farm system

References

External links
1935 Cleveland Indians season at Baseball Reference

Cleveland Indians seasons
Cleveland Indians season
Cleveland Indians